Artem Kosinov (born 31 July 1986 in Taldykorgan) is a Kazakhstani runner. He competed in the 3000 m steeplechase event at the 2012 Summer Olympics.

Competition record

References

1986 births
Living people
People from Taldykorgan
Male steeplechase runners
Kazakhstani male middle-distance runners
Kazakhstani male long-distance runners
Kazakhstani steeplechase runners
Olympic athletes of Kazakhstan
Athletes (track and field) at the 2012 Summer Olympics
Asian Games competitors for Kazakhstan
Athletes (track and field) at the 2010 Asian Games
Competitors at the 2009 Summer Universiade
Competitors at the 2013 Summer Universiade